The Ministry of Education and Vocational Training (MEFP) is the department of the Government of Spain responsible for proposing and carrying out the government policy on education and vocational training, including all the teachings of the education system except university education, without prejudice to the competences of the National Sports Council in matters of sports education. Likewise, it is also the responsibility of this Department the promotion of cooperation actions and, in coordination with the Ministry of Foreign Affairs, the promotion of international relations in the field of non-university education.

The Education in Spain is established as a decentralized system in which the regions has powers over the basic and secondary education while the central government establishes the general basis of the system and it is responsible for the tertiary education. Currently, the Education Ministry has no authority over universities because it is the responsibility of the Ministry of Universities. As of 2018, there are more than 550,000 school teachers and more than 7,000 university professors.

The MEFP is headed by the Minister of Education, who is appointed by the King of Spain at request of the Prime Minister. The Minister is assisted by the Secretary of State for Education, the Secretary-General for Vocational Training (with the rank of Under-Secretary) and the Under-Secretary of the Ministry. In addition, in order to coordinate the education system it exists the Sectoral Conference on Education that is composed by the Education Minister and the Regional Ministers of Education.

Since July 2021 the current minister is Pilar Alegría, from the Spanish Socialist Workers Party.

History

Early period 
The Ministry of Education was created during the regency of Maria Christina of Austria by 1900 Budget Act. However, the government policy on education appeared time before. Section 369 of the Constitution of 1812 created the Directorate-General for Studies for the Inspection of Public Teaching. Thirteen years later the Directorate-General for Studies acquired the name of Inspectorate-General for Public Instruction and, in 1834 it recovers its original denomination. The Royal Decree of May 13, 1846, change its name to Directorate-General for Public Instruction.

It depended on many departments, going through the Secretariat of the Dispatch of Grace and Justice under the reign of Ferdinand VII; the Secretariat of the Dispatch of Development (later called of the Interior) in 1832 with powers on public instruction, universities, economic societies, schools, Royal Academies, Primary Schools and Conservatories of Art and music; the Secretariat of the Dispatch of the Governance of the Realm in 1835 and Secretariat of the Dispatch of Commerce, Instruction and Public Works in 1847.

Since 1855, these responsibilities returned to the Ministry of Development and stayed that way until 1900. During this 45 years, the Directorate-General for Public Instruction assumed powers on Culture and it was divided in offices: universities; high schools; basic schools; archives, libraries and museums; fine arts and development; Accounting and the Intellectual and Industrial Property Bulletin.

Late period 

In 1900, the Ministry of Development split into two ministries, being one of them the Ministry of Public Instruction and Fine Arts. This ministry, that would maintain its denomination until the Civil War, it was driven by prime minister Francisco Silvela who appointed Antonio García Alix as the first Education Minister. PM Silvela had assumed the office a year before and after the disaster of the 1898, it was needed a cut of the government expenditure.

In order to comply with this, in April Silvela reshuffled the Cabinet suppressing the Ministry of Overseas —which lost the sense of its existence after the loss of the last colonies— and the Ministry of Development, creating in its place the Ministry of Public Instruction and of Agriculture.

With the premiership of the Count of Romanones it would begin to shape a model of Ministry with timid regenerationist airs. Initially, it had four sections: Universities and Institutes; First Teaching and Normal Schools; Fine arts; and Civil Constructions and Special Schools, whose work consisted in the promotion of public and private education in its different classes and degrees, the promotion of science and letters, Fine Arts, Archives, Libraries and Museums. It was also part of the ministry the Directorate-General for the Geographical and Statistical Institute.

Throughout those years, the Department widened its structure, with the creation of the Directorate-General for Primary Education (1911) and the Directorate-General for Fine Arts (1915). It was also at this time that the current headquarters were built on Alcalá Street 36 in Madrid.

In Second Republic, the Department assumed the competence on Vocational Training (until then dependent of Labour) and the Directorate-General for Technical and Superior Education is created. Briefly, between May 1937 and March 1939, the ministry merged with the Ministry of Health. After the victory of Franco, the Franco regime change its name to Ministry of National Education and the Department assumed the management of the Spanish and Maria Guerrero theaters, through the so-called National Council of Theaters, which in 1951 was ceded to the newly created Ministry of Information and Tourism.

During this period, the Spanish National Research Council was also created within the Ministry. Through Law 35/1966, of May 31, the Department changed its name to Ministry of Education and Science, which would last three decades. According to statements by the education minister Manuel Lora-Tamayo, it was intended, following recommendations of the Council of Europe and the OECD, to enhance the scientific and research work of the Spanish Administration and put it in direct relation with the tertiary education. An Undersecretariat for Higher Education and Research was also created.

Democracy 
During the reign of Juan Carlos I, the Spanish transition to democracy started and started the specialization of the Administration by creating new ministries for specific work areas. In this sense, in 1977 the Ministry of Culture was created assuming the Directorate-General for Artistic and Cultural Heritage. In 1979 it was created the Ministry of Universities and Research assuming those functions but was suppressed in 1981. In 1990, the National Sports Council was integrated in the Ministry.

After 1996, both Education and Culture merge again and it was created the Secretariats of State for Universities, Research and Development and for Culture, as well as the General Secretariat for Education and Vocational Training. However, under the second term of José María Aznar (2000-2004), Education loses the research competences for the benefit of the new Ministry of Science and Innovation.

In 2004, the new government of José Luis Rodríguez Zapatero recovered the classic name of the Ministry of Education and Science. Again, Culture acquires ministerial rank and Science and Research return to Education. Only for four years, because in 2008 the Ministry of Science and Innovation was created assuming the responsibilities on University Education and Science. In return, the Ministry of Education is assigned the competence on Social Policy. This situation is maintained for one year: In 2009 the functions on tertiary education are returned to Education and the Social Policy goes to Health.

In the first government of Mariano Rajoy, since December 22, 2011, the Ministry of Education is merged again with Culture in the new Department of Education, Culture and Sport. After the motion of no confidence against Rajoy of 2018 and the formation of the new government of Pedro Sanchez in June 2018, the Ministry again broke away from Culture and also loses competences on universities, in favor of the Ministry of Science. It is now called the Ministry of Education and Vocational Training. In 2020, some responsibilities of the Ministry of Labour on vocational training in the labour market were transferred to the Ministry of Education and the vocational training itself was boosted by promoting the Directorate-General for Training to General Secretariat.

Structure 

The current structure of the Department of Education is:

The Secretariat of State for Education.
 The Directorate-General for Evaluation and Territorial Cooperation.
 The Directorate-General for Educational Planning and Management.
The General Secretariat for Vocational Training.
The Deputy Directorate-General for Vocational Training Organization and Innovation.
The Deputy Directorate-General for Orientation and Lifelong Learning.
The Deputy Directorate-General for Vocational Training Planning and Management.
The National Institute for Qualifications.
The Undersecretariat of Education and Vocational Training.
 The Technical General Secretariat.
The Budget Office.
The Administrative Office.
The Deputy Directorate-General for Personnel.
The Deputy Directorate-General for Information and Communications Technologies.
The Deputy Directorate-General for Economic and Financial Management.
The Inspectorate-General of Services.

List of Ministers

Regency of María Cristina for Alfonso XIII (1885-1902)

Reign of Alfonso XIII (1902–1923)

Dictadura de Primo de Rivera (1923–1931)

II Republic (1931–1939)

Francoism (1936–1975)

Reign of Juan Carlos I (born 1975)

Reign of Felipe VI (2014– ) 

Since the reign of Alfonso XIII, the current Ministry of Education has successively been known by the following titles:

 Ministry of Public Instruction and Fine Arts (1900–1937) (1).
 Ministry of Public Instruction and Health (1937–1939) (2).
 Commission of Culture and Education of the Technical Board of the State (1936–1938) (3).
 Ministry of Education (1938–1968, 1976–1978, 2009–2011) (4).
 Ministry of Education and Science (1973–1976, 1978–1981, 1981–1996, 2004–2008) (5).
 Ministry of Education and University (1968–1973, 1981) (6).
 Ministry of Education and Culture (1996–2000) (7).
 Ministry of Education, Culture and Sport (2000–2004, 2011–2018) (8).
 Ministry of Education, Social policy and Sport (2008–2009) (9).
Ministry of Education and Vocational Training (2018- ) (10).

See also
Rover Environmental Monitoring Station
Education in Spain

Notes and references
Official website of Ministry of Education

External links
Official website 

1900 establishments in Spain
 
Education
Spain, Education
Education
Calle de Alcalá
Education